François de Belleforest (1530 – 1 January 1583) was a prolific French author, poet and translator of the Renaissance.

He was born in Samatan (actual department of Gers), into a poor family, and his father (a soldier) was killed when he was seven. He spent some time in the court of Marguerite of Navarre, traveled to Toulouse and Bordeaux (where he met George Buchanan), and then to Paris where he came into contact with members of the young literary generation, including Pierre de Ronsard, Jean Antoine de Baïf, Jean Dorat, Remy Belleau, Antoine Du Verdier and Odet de Turnèbe. In 1568 he became historiographer to the king.  He died in Paris.

Belleforest wrote on cosmography, morals, literature and history, and he translated the works of Matteo Bandello, Boccaccio, Antonio de Guevara, Lodovico Guicciardini, Polydore Vergil, Saint Cyprian, Sebastian Münster, Achilles Tatius, Cicero and Demosthenes into French. He is also the author of the first French pastoral novel, La Pyrénée (or La Pastorale amoureuse) (1571) modeled on the Diana of Jorge de Montemayor. His Grandes Annales are a polemic tract against François Hotman. His total output comprises more than 50 volumes.

His most successful work was most likely his translation and adaptation of the "histoires tragiques" by the Italian Matteo Bandello, which built on the work of Pierre Boaistuau and eventually amounted to seven volumes (1564–1582). One of these tales might be the source for Shakespeare's Hamlet.

Selected works
  (poems), 1561.
 , translation of Matteo Bandello, 1559.
 , translation of Matteo Bandello, 7 volumes, 1566–1583.
 Les Amours de Clitophon et de Leucippe by Achilles Tatius, 1568.
 , 1570
 La Pyrénée (or ), 1571.
 , by Françoys de Belle-Forest. Paris, Nicolas Chesneau, 1572
 . Paris, 1575. Nicolas Chesneau and Michel Sonnius. French translation of the Cosmographia of Sebastian Münster, with substantial additional material.
 , 1579.
 . Jacob Stoer, (Geneva): 1609.
 . Pierre Chevalier, 1621. Last edition and the most complete of the Chroniques of Nicole Gilles, first published in 1525.

See also
Other major translators from his period:
 Jacques Amyot
 Claude Colet
 Jacques Gohory
 Nicolas de Herberay des Essarts

References

 Simonin, Michel, ed. Dictionnaire des lettres françaises - Le XVIe siècle. Paris: Fayard, 2001.

External links
 

1530 births
1583 deaths
People from Gers
16th-century French novelists
16th-century French writers
16th-century male writers
French male novelists
French historiographers
Italian–French translators
Latin–French translators
Spanish–French translators
German–French translators
French male non-fiction writers
16th-century French translators